Macleaya microcarpa is a species of flowering plant in the poppy family Papaveraceae.

Etymology
The name Macleaya commemorates Alexander Macleay (1767-1848), a Scottish/Australian entomologist. The specific epithet microcarpa means "small fruit". Plants of the genus Macleaya are commonly called plume poppies.

Cultivation
Macleaya microcarpa is an imposing architectural plant which self-seeds readily, and may become a nuisance in a garden setting. It is popular as a subject for flower arranging. The cultivar 'Kelway's Coral Plume', with pink-tinged flowers, has gained the Royal Horticultural Society's Award of Garden Merit.

References

Papaveroideae